Neily Judith Carrasquel García (born 26 July 1997) is a Venezuelan footballer who plays as a defensive midfielder for Atlético Venezuela CF and the Venezuela women's national team.

Club career
Carrasquel is a former player of Deportivo La Guaira FC.

International career
Carrasquel represented Venezuela at the 2013 Bolivarian Games and the 2016 FIFA U-20 Women's World Cup. At senior level, she played the 2018 Copa América Femenina and the 2018 Central American and Caribbean Games.

References

1997 births
Living people
Women's association football midfielders
Women's association football central defenders
Venezuelan women's footballers
Footballers from Caracas
Venezuela women's international footballers
Deportivo La Guaira players
Atlético Junior footballers
Monagas S.C. players
Venezuelan expatriate women's footballers
Venezuelan expatriate sportspeople in Colombia
Expatriate women's footballers in Colombia
Venezuelan expatriate sportspeople in Paraguay
Expatriate women's footballers in Paraguay